The Inheritor is a 1973 French film starring Jean-Paul Belmondo.

Plot

Hugo Cordell, media and industrial tycoon, dies when his plane explodes between Geneva and Paris. Examination of the plane's debris cannot establish the cause of the crash.

In Paris, the directors of 'Globe', the Cordell empire's flagship French weekly, anxiously await the arrival of Hugo Cordell's heir Bart (Jean-Paul Belmondo), who wishes to read the last issue before it goes to press. On the flight back from the United States Bart flirts with the seductive Lauren (Maureen Kerwin), who slips a baggage claim-check into his pocket.

At the airport Bart is welcomed by 'Globe' management and television reporters. The claim-check is found by a customs agent to correspond with a briefcase full of illegal drugs, and Bart is accused of drug trafficking. He understands perfectly that his arrival to head the Cordell empire does not meet with universal approval.

Aided by his faithful friend, David (Charles Denner), he decides to conduct his own investigation.

Cast 

 Jean-Paul Belmondo as Barthelemy Cordell 
 Carla Gravina as  Liza Rocquencourt 
 Jean Rochefort as  André Berthier
 Charles Denner as  David Loweinstein 
 Jean Desailly as Jean-Pierre Carnavan 
 François Chaumette as  Theron-Maillard
 Michel Beaune as  Frédéric Lambert
 Pierre Grasset as  Pierre Delmas
 Maurice Garrel as Detective Brayen
 Maureen Kerwin as  Lauren
 Jean Martin as Monseigneur Schneider
 Marcel Cuvelier as The Minister 
 Fosco Giachetti as Luigi Galazzi
 Anna Orso as  Giovanella Cordell
 Paul Amiot as  Hugo Cordell
 Michel Cassagne as André Dubois
 Serge Wagner as  Campanella
 Philippe Labro as Journalist

References

External links

The Inheritor at Le Film Guide

French action thriller films
1973 films
Films scored by Michel Colombier
1970s business films
Films about inheritances
1970s French films